Pieter-Jan de Pue (1982, Ghent) is a photographer and film director from Belgium. He studied at the visual arts school RITS. His first film documentary is "The Land of the Enlightened" which won a World Cinema Documentary Special Jury Award for Best Cinematography at the Sundance Film Festival in 2016. While shooting the film he was attacked by the Taliban.

Filmography 

 O (2006)
 The Land of the Enlightened (2016)
 Girls and Honey (2017)

References

External links

Belgian film directors
1982 births
Living people